Droop is an unincorporated community in Pocahontas County, West Virginia, United States, in the Greenbrier River Valley.

The community takes its name from nearby Droop Mountain. The area lends its name to Droop Mountain Battlefield State Park, site of West Virginia's last significant Civil War battle. The Civilian Conservation Corps (CCC) constructed the park's trails and buildings in the 1930s, as part of Franklin D. Roosevelt's New Deal legislation. Today, a small museum on the park grounds houses Civil War artifacts and discusses the park's CCC history. Bi-annually, the West Virginia Reenactors Association reenacts the Droop Mountain battle.

Places of interest 
 Droop Mountain Battlefield State Park
 The Civilian Conservation Corps Museum, Civil War History
 Beartown State Park
 Hiking Trails at Both State Parks
 The nearby town of Hillsboro, West Virginia
 The Pearl S. Buck Birthplace

References

External links 

Unincorporated communities in Pocahontas County, West Virginia
Unincorporated communities in West Virginia
Pocahontas County, West Virginia in the American Civil War